Kinship is a Canadian short drama film, directed by Jorge Camarotti and released in 2019. The film stars Rabah Aït Ouyahia as Rabah and Ryan Nikirad as Cédrick, a father and son struggling with their grief after the death of their wife and mother.

The film premiered in March 2019 at the Saguenay International Short Film Festival.

The film received a Canadian Screen Award nomination for Best Live Action Short Drama at the 8th Canadian Screen Awards in 2020.

References

External links
 

2019 films
2019 drama films
2019 short films
Films about grieving
Quebec films
French-language Canadian films
Canadian drama short films
2010s Canadian films